Luigi Arienti (born 6 January 1937) is an Italian former racing cyclist. At the 1960 Summer Olympics, he and teammates Marino Vigna, Mario Vallotto and Franco Testa won an Olympic gold medal in the team pursuit, with a time of 4:30.90.

Arienti was one of the best Italian amateur cyclists in 1960, and was selected for the Olympic games. After the Olympic Games, Arienti became professional, focussing on track events and six-day racing. After 1972 he ended his career.

References

1937 births
Living people
People from Desio
Italian male cyclists
Olympic cyclists of Italy
Olympic gold medalists for Italy
Cyclists at the 1960 Summer Olympics
Italian track cyclists
Olympic medalists in cycling
Medalists at the 1960 Summer Olympics
Cyclists from the Province of Monza e Brianza
20th-century Italian people